Çalışkan is a belde in the Silopi district of Şırnak Province in Turkey. The settlement is populated by Kurds of the Bersuva tribe and had a population of 4,896 in 2021.

References 

Kurdish settlements in Şırnak Province
Populated places in Şırnak Province
Towns in Turkey